The 1992–93 Detroit Red Wings season was the Red Wings' 61st season, the franchise's 67th. During the 1992–93 season, the Red Wings qualified for the NHL playoffs.

Offseason

Regular season
In addition to leading all teams with most goals scored during the regular season (369), the Red Wings also scored the most power-play goals (113) and had the best power-play conversion percentage (24.89%). For the second consecutive season, five players reached 30-goals or more.

Season standings

Playoffs

In the Norris Division Semifinals series against the Toronto Maple Leafs, the Red Wings outscored the Leafs 30–24 through seven games but lost the deciding game in overtime on Nikolai Borschevsky's famous deflection goal. It was the second overtime loss for Detroit (both came at Joe Louis Arena) in the series.

Schedule and results

October

November

December

January

February

March

April

Player statistics

Forwards
Note: GP = Games played; G = Goals; A = Assists; Pts = Points; PIM = Penalty minutes

Defencemen
Note: GP = Games played; G = Goals; A = Assists; Pts = Points; PIM = Penalty minutes

Goaltending
Note: GP = Games played; W = Wins; L = Losses; T = Ties; SO = Shutouts; GAA = Goals against average

Playoffs
Detroit qualified for the playoffs for the third consecutive season, where they lost their first round series against Toronto in seven games.

Draft picks
Detroit's draft picks at the 1992 NHL Entry Draft held at the Montreal Forum in Montreal, Quebec.

References
 Red Wings on Hockey Database

Detroit
Detroit
Detroit Red Wings seasons
Detroit Red Wings
Detroit Red Wings